The Embassy of Monaco in London is the diplomatic mission of the Principality of Monaco in the United Kingdom.

The embassy building in London houses the embassy, the Monaco Economic Board and the Monaco Tourist Authority, with a mission statement given on their website as:

 To build a bridge and create effective communication between the UK and Monaco for visitors, workers and investors – giving access to relevant information and to useful procedures 
 To tighten diplomatic relations between the UK and Monaco and to strengthen judicial co-operation with the UK's Foreign Office and Home Office
 To develop artistic and cultural partnerships between Monaco and the UK
 To support the missions of H.S.H. Prince Albert II in matters of Environment through the Prince Albert II of Monaco Foundation (UK) 
 To promote joint activities between the different UK and Monaco charitable associations
 To promote all the other aspects of Monaco and to help the British public get a truer perception of the Principality
 To ably assist individuals and families interested in relocating to Monaco

Monaco also has honorary consulates in Birmingham and Edinburgh.

Gallery

References

External links
Official site
Profile of Evelyne Genta - Ambassador 2018

Monaco
Diplomatic missions of Monaco
Monaco
Monaco–United Kingdom relations